Radical 126 or radical and  meaning "" or "" is one of the 29 Kangxi radicals (214 radicals in total) composed of 6 strokes.

In the Kangxi Dictionary, there are 22 characters (out of 49,030) to be found under this radical.

 is also the 127 indexing component in the Table of Indexing Chinese Character Components predominantly adopted by Simplified Chinese dictionaries published in mainland China.

Evolution

Derived characters

Further reading

External links

 Unihan Database - U+800C

126
127